Ahmad Senjer (full name: Muizz ad-Dunya wa ad-Din Adud ad-Dawlah Abul-Harith Ahmad Sanjar ibn Malik-Shah) (b. 1085 – d. 8 May 1157) was the Seljuq ruler of Khorasan from 1097 until in 1118, when he became the Sultan of the Seljuq Empire, which he ruled until his death in 1157.

Early years 
Sanjar was born in ca. 1086 in Sinjar, a town situated in northwestern Iraq. Although primary sources state that he was named after his birthplace (Rāvandi, p. 185; Ebn al-Jawzi, XVIII, p. 161) Bosworth notes Sanjar is a Turkic name, denoting "he who pierces", "he who thrusts". He was a son of Malik Shah I and participated in wars of succession against his three brothers and a nephew, namely Mahmud I, Barkiyaruq, Malik Shah II and Muhammad I.  In 1096, he was given the province of Khorasan to govern under his brother Muhammad I. Over the next several years Ahmad Sanjar became the ruler of most of Iran with his capital at Nishapur.

Governor of Khorasan 
A number of rulers revolted against Sanjar and continued the split of the Great Seljuq Empire that had started upon dynastic wars. In 1102, he repulsed an invasion from Kashgaria, killing Jibrail Arslan Khan near Termez. In 1107, he invaded the domains of the Ghurid ruler Izz al-Din Husayn and captured him, but later released him in return for tribute.

Sanjar undertook a campaign to eliminate the Assassins within Persia and successfully drove them from a number of their strongholds including Quhistan and Tabas. However, an anecdote indicates that en route to their stronghold at Alamut, Sanjar woke up one day to find a dagger beside him, pinning a note from Hassan-i Sabbah stating that he (Hassan) would like peace. Sanjar, shocked by this event, sent envoys to Hassan and they both agreed to stay out of each other's way.

In 1117, he marched against the Ghaznavid Sultan Arslan-Shah of Ghazna defeating him at Battle of Ghazni and installing Arslan's brother Bahram-Shah in the throne as a Seljuk vassal.

Sultan of the Great Seljuk Empire 

On February 26, 1105 Sultan Barkiyaruq died. He chose his younger son, Muizzeddin Malik-Shah, as heir to the throne. Malikshah took the name Malik-Shah II after being proclaimed the Sultan of the Seljuk Empire. However, the true power was in the hands of his uncle, Muhammad Tapar. In the same year, Muhammad Tapar dethroned his nephew and started to rule the State himself as sultan. When Muhammad died on April 4, 1118, his son Mahmud II was declared as new sultan. 
When Muhammad's son Mahmud II ascended the throne, Emir of Yazd Garshasp II fell into disgrace; slander about him spread to the court that made him lose confidence, and made Mahmud send a military force to Yazd where Garshasp was arrested and jailed in Jibal, while Yazd was granted to the royal cupbearer. Garshasp, however, escaped and returned to Yazd, where he requested protection from Ahmad Sanjar (Garshasp's wife was the sister of Ahmad).

Garshasp urged Ahmad to invade the domains of Mahmud in Central Iran and gave him information on how to march to Central Iran, and the ways to combat Mahmud. Ahmad accepted and advanced with an army to the west in 1119, where he together with "five kings" defeated Mahmud at Saveh. The kings who aided Ahmad during the battle were Garshasp himself, the Emir of Sistan and the Khwarazmshah, including two other unnamed kings. Nizari forces were also present in Sanjar's army. After being victorious, Ahmad then restored the domains of Garshasp II. Ahmad then marched as far as Baghdad, where he agreed with Mahmud that he should marry one of his daughters, and that he should give up strategic territories in northern Persia.

In 1141, Ahmad, along with Garshasp II, marched to confront the Kara Khitan threat and engaged them near Samarkand at the Battle of Qatwan. He suffered an astounding defeat, and Garshasp was killed. Ahmad escaped with only fifteen of his elite horsemen, losing all Seljuq territory east of the Syr Darya (Jaxartes).

Sanjar’s as well as the Seljuks' rule collapsed as a consequence of yet another unexpected defeat, this time at the hands of the Seljuks’ own tribe, in 1153. Sanjar was captured during the battle and held in captivity until 1156. It brought chaos to the Empire - situation later exploited by the victorious Turkmens, whose hordes would overrun Khorasan unopposed, wreaking colossal damage on the province and prestige of Sanjar. Sanjar eventually escaped from captivity in the fall of 1156, but soon died in Merv (present-day Turkmenistan), in 1157. After his death, Turkic rulers, Turkmen tribal forces, and other secondary powers competed for Khorasan, and after a long period of confrontations, the province was finally conquered by Khwarazmians in the early 1200s.

Death and legacy 

Sanjar died in 1157 and was buried in Merv. His tomb was destroyed by the Mongols in 1221, during their invasion of the Khwarezmian Empire.

The death of Sanjar meant the end of the Seljuq dynasty as an empire, since they controlled only Iraq and Azerbaijan afterwards. Sanjar is considered one of the most prominent Seljuq sultans and was the longest reigning Muslim ruler until the Mongols arrived. Although of Turkic origin, Sanjar was highly Iranized, and due to his feats, even became a legendary figure like some of the mythological characters in the Shahnameh. Indeed, medieval sources described Sanjar as having "the majesty of the Khosrows and the glory of the Kayanids". Persian poetry flourished under Sanjar, and his court included some of the greatest Persian poets, such as Mu'izzi, Nizami Aruzi, and Anvari.

Family 
Sanjar's only wife was Terken Khatun. She was the daughter of Muhammad Arslan Khan, the ruler of the Kara-Khanid Khanate. She died in April 1156. One of Sanjar's daughters was Mah-i Mulk Khatun. She was born in 1105. In probably 1119, Sanjar married her to his nephew Mahmud II. When she died aged seventeen in 1122, Sanjar sent another daughter, Amir Sitti Khatun, to be his wife. Gawhar Nasab Khatun was the daughter of this union. She died in 1129. Another of Sanjar's daughters married Abbasid Caliph Al-Mustarshid in 1124. Another daughter of Sanjar, Gawhar Khatun married his nephew, Ghiyath ad-Din Mas'ud in 1134. A daughter of this union was married by Mas'ud to his nephew Dawud, son of Mahmud II. They failed to get on together, and Ma'sud gave his daughter to Dawud's brother, Muhammad II.

References

Sources

External links
 SANJAR, Aḥmad b. Malekšāh

1157 deaths
Seljuk rulers
1080s births
11th-century Turkic people
12th-century Turkic people
Nizari Ismaili–Seljuk relations
People of the Nizari–Seljuk wars